Macrobathra sarcoleuca is a moth in the family Cosmopterigidae. It was described by Edward Meyrick in 1915. It is found in Australia, where it has been recorded from Queensland.

References

Macrobathra
Moths described in 1915